Neurohlau was a subcamp of Flossenbürg concentration camp, mainly for women prisoners of several European nationalities including Czech, Soviet, Yugoslavian, Belgian, Polish, and German. It was located on the edge of the municipality Neurohlau (now Nová Role) in the historical territory of Sudetenland (in the present-day Czech Republic). The Germans founded the camp in the autumn of 1942 and closed it in April 1945. Its main purpose was providing workers for the nearby Bohemia porcelain factory. At least 41 prisoners died in the camp (unearthed from the mass grave in June 1945); about 500 died during the death march out in April 1945; an unknown number died after their deportation back to the mother camps (Ravensbrück and Flossenbürg); and some others were burnt in the camp in Karlovy Vary. After World War II, the camp served as a collecting camp for prisoners of war before their removal to Germany.

References 
 Koncentrační tábor v Nové Roli 1942–1945 This is a short history of the camp with photos.
 Lágr. Temná minulost Nové Role This article contains some eyewitness accounts describing life in the camp.
 Novorolský zpravodaj červen 2008 The front page contains a short account about the death march.
 Na nacistické koncentrační tábory se v ČR zapomíná A Czech BBC interviewer is asking some former inmates of the camp about their knowledge and memories of the camp.
 Neviditelný pes, HISTORIE: Krvavé jaro 1945 This article about the Zwodau-Svatava concentration camp near the Czech town of Sokolov contains some information about te Nová Role camp.
 Nová Role and its neighborhood today and in the past.
 A short history of the Nová Role concentration camp between the years of 1942–1945, also including the death march from the camp on 20 April 1945: unpublished manuscript deposited with the municipality of Nová Role.
 Not far from Nürnberg: From the history of the Extraordinary People's Court in Cheb from 1946 to 1948.

Subcamps of Flossenbürg
Nazi concentration camps in Czechoslovakia
Czechoslovakia in World War II
World War II sites in the Czech Republic
Karlovy Vary District